A union territory is a type of administrative division in the Republic of India. Unlike the states of India, which have their own governments, union territories are federal territories governed, in part or in whole, by the Union Government of India. There are currently eight union territories in India, namely Andaman and Nicobar Islands, Chandigarh, Dadra and Nagar Haveli and Daman and Diu, Delhi, Jammu and Kashmir, Ladakh, Lakshadweep and Puducherry.

History 

When the Constitution of India was adopted in 1949, the Indian federal structure included:
 Part C states, which were chief commissioners' provinces and some princely states, each governed by a chief commissioner appointed by the President of India. The ten Part C states were Ajmer, Bhopal, Bilaspur, Coorg, Delhi, Himachal Pradesh, Cutch, Manipur, Tripura and Vindhya Pradesh.
 One Part D state (Andaman and Nicobar Islands) administered by a lieutenant governor appointed by the central government.

After the States Reorganisation Act, 1956, Part C and Part D states were combined into a single category of "Union territory". Due to various other reorganisations, only 6 union territories remained: 
 Andaman and Nicobar Islands
 Laccadive, Minicoy & Amindivi Islands (later renamed Lakshadweep)
 Delhi
 Manipur
 Tripura
 Himachal Pradesh

By the early 1970s, Manipur, Tripura, and Himachal Pradesh had become full-fledged states, and Chandigarh became a union territory. Another three (Dadra and Nagar Haveli and Daman and Diu and Puducherry) were formed from acquired territories that formerly belonged to non-British colonial powers (Portuguese India and French India, respectively).

In August 2019, the Parliament of India passed Jammu and Kashmir Reorganisation Act, 2019. The act contains provisions to reconstitute the state of Jammu and Kashmir into two union territories, one to be eponymously called Jammu and Kashmir, and the other Ladakh on 31 October 2019.

In November 2019, the Government of India introduced legislation to merge the union territories of Dadra and Nagar Haveli and Daman and Diu into a single union territory to be known as Dadra and Nagar Haveli and Daman and Diu.

Administration 
The Parliament of India can pass a law to amend the constitution and provide a Legislature with elected Members and a Chief Minister for a union territory, as it has done for Delhi and Puducherry. Generally, the President of India appoints an administrator or lieutenant governor for each UT.

Delhi, Puducherry, Jammu, and Kashmir operate differently from the other five. They were given partial statehood and Delhi was redefined as the [National Capital Territory] (NCT) and incorporated into a larger area known as the National Capital Region (NCR). Delhi, Puducherry, Jammu, and Kashmir have an elected legislative assembly and an executive council of ministers with a partially state-like function.

Due to the existence of union territories, many critics have resolved India into a semi-federal nation, as the central and state governments each have their domains and territories of legislation. Union territories of India have special rights and status due to their constitutional formation and development. The status of "union territory" may be assigned to an Indian sub-jurisdiction for reasons such as safeguarding the rights of indigenous cultures, averting political turmoil related to matters of governance, and so on. These union territories could be changed to states in the future for more efficient administrative control.

The Constitution does not stipulate how tax revenue is to be devolved to the union territories, unlike for the states. The fund's devolution to union territories by the union government has no criteria where all the revenue goes to the union government. Some union territories are provided more funds, while others are given less, arbitrarily by the union government. As union territories are directly ruled by the union government, some union territories get more funds from the union government than entitled on per capita and backwardness basis when compared to states.

After the introduction of GST, UT-GST is applicable in union territories that do not have a legislative assembly. UT- GST is levied at par with the applicable state GST in the rest of the country which would eliminate the previous lower taxation in the union territories.

Constitutional status 
Article 1 (1) of the Indian constitution says that India shall be a "Union of States", which is elaborated under Parts V (The Union) and VI (The States) of the constitution. Article 1 (3) says the territory of India comprises the territories of the states, the union territories and other territories that may be acquired. The concept of union territories was not in the original version of the constitution, but was added by the Constitution (Seventh Amendment) Act, 1956. Article 366(30) also defines Union territory as any union territory specified in the First Schedule and includes any other territory comprised within the territory of India but not specified in that Schedule. In the constitution wherever it refers to Territories of India, it is applicable to the whole country including union territories. Where it refers to only India, it applies to all states only but not to union territories. Thus, citizenship (part II), fundamental rights (part III), Directive Principles of State Policy (part IV), Judiciary role, the Union Territories (part VIII), Article 245, etc. apply to union territories as it refers specifically to Territories of India. The executive power of the Union (i.e. union of states only) rests with President of India. The President of India is also the chief administrator of union territories as per Article 239. The union public service commission's role does not apply to all territories of India as it refers to India only in Part XIV.

The constitutional status of a union territory is similar to a state under the perennial president's rule per Article 356 subject to specific exemptions to a few union territories with legislative assembly. Per Article 240 (2), supreme power is accorded to the president in regulating the affairs of all the union territories except Chandigarh, NCT and Puducherry, including powers to override the laws made by Parliament and the constitution of India. Article 240 (2) allows implementing tax haven laws in these union territories to attract foreign capital and investments into India instead of depending on foreign tax haven countries.

The difference between states as listed in the First Schedule of the constitution and union territories with legislative assembly is that states were given autonomous powers as provided in the constitution without any possible interference by the parliament whereas UTs with legislative assembly (Part VIII) has similar powers but parliament is empowered to modify or repeal or suspend the laws made by a union territory (ultimate authority by the parliament unlike the independent nature of the states).

Three of the union territories have representation in the upper house of the Indian Parliament, the Rajya Sabha: Delhi, Jammu and Kashmir, and Puducherry. Puducherry, Jammu and Kashmir and NCT of Delhi are the only 3 Union Territories that are exceptional among union territories in that each has its own locally elected legislative assembly and have a Chief Minister.

Current union territories

Former union territories

Proposed union territories 

There have been a number of movements and proposals to carve out additional states and union territories.

See also 
 Staff Selection Commission
 Federalism in India
 Lawmaking procedure in India
 List of amendments of the Constitution of India
 List of Acts of the Parliament of India

References

External links 
 

 
States and union territories of India
Administrative divisions of India
Territories